Mantsopa Local Municipality is a local municipality in the Thabo Mofutsanyana District of the Free State in South Africa.

Origin of the name
Basotho prophet 'Mantsopa Makhetha was a cousin to King Moshoeshoe I, who banished her from the Kingdom when he suspected that her powers were greater than his. When she arrived at Modderpoort there were no houses and, according to legend, she stayed in a cave. In 1886 a group of men called The Brotherhood of St Augustine arrived at Modderpoort, and 'Mantsopa accommodated them in her cave. The missionaries decided to stay and they turned the cave into a chapel. 'Mantsopa later joined the church and was baptised and given the name Anna. 'Mantsopa's grave continues to be visited and offerings are still placed on or near it.

Main places
The 2001 census divided the municipality into the following main places:

Politics 

The municipal council consists of eighteen members elected by mixed-member proportional representation. Nine councillors are elected by first-past-the-post voting in nine wards, while the remaining nine are chosen from party lists so that the total number of party representatives is proportional to the number of votes received. In the election of 1 November 2021 the African National Congress (ANC) won a majority of eleven seats on the council.

The following table shows the results of the election.

References

External links
 http://www.mantsopa.fs.gov.za/

Local municipalities of the Thabo Mofutsanyane District Municipality